RCC Institute of Information Technology (RCCIIT) is a government sponsored engineering institute which is located in Kolkata, West Bengal, India. The institute was established in 1999. Government aids are given to the institution by Government of West Bengal and is academically affiliated to Maulana Abul Kalam Azad University of Technology. It is considered one of the best engineering institutes under West Bengal Joint Entrance Examination.

All the faculties of this institution are recruited by the Government of West Bengal.

History
The RCC Institute of Information Technology (RCCIIT) was set up in 1999 headed by Jadavpur University.

Initially, the institution started with only three streams viz. Bachelor's in Computer Science and Information Technology and Master's in Computer Application. In 2006, a new stream was added to the bachelor's degree - Electronics and Communication Engineering. From 2010 onwards many new streams and master's degree in different Engineering courses were added.

Campus 

The college campuses are located at Canal South Road, Beliaghata, Kolkata-700015. The old campus is housed at the old Government College of Engineering and Leather Technology campus. A new campus is about 20 metres from the old campus.

The campus is a 10 minutes drive away from East Metropolitan Bypass (near Chingrighata- away). The nearest airport is Netaji Subhash Chandra Bose International Airport at Dum Dum, Kolkata. It is a 10 minutes walk away from the nearest bus stop Beliaghata (CIT More) and is well connected with the two city stations, Howrah and Sealdah.

There is no hostel facility in this college.

Organization and Administration
The institute is a unit of the RCC Institute of Information Technology, an autonomous society of Department of Higher Education, Government of West Bengal, with part funding from the Government of West Bengal. This provides the institution with a degree of autonomy, while being administrated and funded by the Government. It has been selected for a TEQIP grant in the govt/govt aided category by the World Bank

The institute is currently headed by Prof. (Dr.) Ashok Mondal as the principal and Prof.(Dr.) Ajoy Kumar Ray (Padmashri) who has been given the responsibility of chairing the RCCIIT society by the Department of Higher Education, Government of West Bengal.

Academics

Admissions 
Admission to the undergraduate B.Tech. courses is done through the WBJEE or Joint Entrance Examination JEE MAIN. Postgraduate admissions are done on the basis of ranks in national entrance examinations like GATE or the state level examination PGET conducted by MAKAUT, WB.

Admission for second year B.Tech courses is through Lateral Entry Scheme. The interested candidate should have Diploma in Engineering or Technology with at least 60% marks from any AICTE recognized Polytechnic Institute.

Courses Offered 
The offered by RCCIIT are:

B.Tech Courses ( 4-year Program) 

 Computer Science & Engineering (CSE) (NBA Certified)
 Electronics and Communication Engineering (ECE) (NBA Certified)
 Information Technology (IT) (NBA Certified)
 Electrical Engineering (EE)
 Applied Electronics and Instrumentation Engineering (AEIE)

The AICTE approved intake for Computer Science & Engineering, Information Technology, and Electronics and Communication Engineering is 120. For Electrical Engineering and Applied Electronics and Instrumentation Engineering, the approved AICTE intake is 60 and 30 respectively.

M.Tech Courses ( 2-year Program) 

 Computer Science & Engineering
 Computer Science & Engineering (Artificial intelligence)
 VLSI and Microelectronics

RCCIIT has 18 seats for Computer Science & Engineering and Computer Science & Engineering (Artificial intelligence) and 12 seats for VLSI and Microelectronics.

Masters in Computer Applications (MCA) 
RCCIIT also offers Masters in Computer Applications, a two-year degree course with 60 seats.

Student life

Freshers Welcome
Freshers are welcomed to the institution by their seniors every year with a cultural event known as BIHAAN.

Technical Fest
The students of the college organize a technical fest every year which sharpens their technical skills known as Techtrix. Software competitions, paper presentations, programming in various languages, technical quiz, robotics and debate competitions are held. Technical colleges from all over the state participate in the competitions. Seminars and exhibitions are also held as a part of this program.

Cultural Fest
Every year the institute holds an annual fest, Regalia, organized by the students. Students from various institutes compete with others in the fields like drama, choreography, quiz, antakshari, solo and group singing competition, fashion shows, war of bands, and various other fields. Students of the institute perform skits, musical performances and plays. To make it more entertaining skilled performers from different genres are invited. Some major music bands and singers rock the students. Apart from the annual fest, there are other cultural programs, organized around the year where the students get a chance to show their talent.

Sports
The students organize intra-college and inter-college sports in a variety of games and sports such as table tennis, cricket, football and carrom tournaments. The inter-college sports fest is known as "Game of Thrones" and the intra-college sports fest is known as "Krrirrathon".

Institute Clubs

Rotaract Club of RCCIIT 
RCC Institute of Information Technology has its own institute-based Rotaract Club sponsored by the Rotary Club of Calcutta Renaissance. The club was established by the students of RCCIIT on 13 June 2017 with Awsaf Ambar as the Charter President. The purpose of the club is to conduct non-profit social activities for career development and personal growth.

The current president of Rotaract Club of RCCIIT is Rtr. Sumit Anand.

Google DSC RCCIIT 
Google DSC RCCIIT is a newly formed tech club of RCCIIT. Formed in 2021 by Supratik Chakraborty, the club mainly organizes hands-on workshops, hackathons and study jams revolving around numerous technological stacks.

See also

References

External links
 Official website

Information technology institutes
Colleges affiliated to West Bengal University of Technology
Engineering colleges in West Bengal
Educational institutions established in 1999
1999 establishments in West Bengal